Paka is a shield volcano located in the Great Rift Valley, Kenya. Geothermal activity is widespread at Paka. Paka means "ochre" in Pokot.

See also
 List of volcanoes in Kenya

References 
 

Mountains of Kenya
Volcanoes of Kenya
Polygenetic shield volcanoes
Active volcanoes